El Seis (call sign LU 93 TV) is an Argentine private, over-the-air television station broadcasting from the city of San Carlos de Bariloche. It is the only over-the-air TV station available in this area.

Local shows
Noticiero 6 - local newscast

External links
Official website

Television stations in Argentina
Television channels and stations established in 1978
Bariloche
1978 establishments in Argentina